Guioa coriacea , commonly known as cedar or island cedar, is a flowering plant in the family Sapindaceae. The specific epithet refers to the coriaceous (leathery) leaves.

Description
It is a tree growing to 15 m in height. The shiny paripinnate leaves, with under-rolled edges and 1–4 pairs of leaflets, are 30–110 mm long, 12–50 mm wide. The white, tinged pink, 6 mm long flowers occur in clusters from December to February. The fruits are green-brown, 3-lobed woody capsules, 25 mm long. The small black seeds are 1–1.5 mm long and covered with a fleshy orange aril. The trees are often noticeable in early winter because of the orange arils on the seeds that have fallen to the ground.

Distribution and habitat
The species is endemic to Australia’s subtropical Lord Howe Island in the Tasman Sea where it is common in sheltered lowland forest.

References

External links

coriacea
Endemic flora of Lord Howe Island
Plants described in 1878
Sapindales of Australia
Taxa named by Ludwig Adolph Timotheus Radlkofer